Samajwadi Jana Parishad (translation: "Socialist People's Council"), is a political party in India.

Foundation
The party was founded in 1995 by late Kishen Pattanayak and many grassroot level political organisations who believed in creating an alternative political culture. Active members of the party cannot have any association with foreign funded NGOs. The ideology of the party is based upon the thoughts of Mahatma Gandhi, Ram Manohar Lohiya, Jayaprakash Narayan, Ambedkar and Vinoba Bhave. It is active in 15 states. It believes that Globalisation is a counter-revolution phase and hence associates itself with anti-globalisation struggles.

It has involved in many historic struggles in various parts of India such as Mehdiganj, Mau (UP), Betul, Kesla (MP), Niyamgiri, Jagjitsinghpur-POSCO (Odisha), Jalpaiguri (North Bengal), Kudankulam (Tamil Nadu) etc...

This was the only party to have protested and almost barged into the Commonwealth Games Office at Central Delhi protesting against the huge spending by the Govt.

The party is very close to many popular people's movements. It is a founding member of the National Alliance of People's Movements N A P M.

Party structure
In the 11th national council held at Jateswar, Alipurduar (West Bengal) on 29,30 April & 1 May 2017. the following are elected as its new office bearers.
 President: Lingaraj Azad
 Vice Presidents:
 Adv Kamal Bannerjee
 Adv Joshy Jacob
 General Secretary: Aflatoon (Uttar Pradesh)
 Organizing Secretary: Ranjit Kr Roy (West Bengal)
 Secretaries: Phagh Ram (Madhya Pradesh), Prof Mahesh Vikram (UP), Tara Jadhav (Maharashtra), Atul Kumar (Delhi)
 Treasurer: Dr. Chandra Bhusan Choudhary (Jharkhand)

Electoral records
It has been participating and contesting in general elections, but has not won any seats in the Rajyasabha or Loksabha or state assembly elections.

Madhya Pradesh - 2003
The party took part in Madhya Pradesh elections, with four candidates:
 Mangal Sing for Ghora Dongri
 Fagram - Itarsi
 Shamim Modi - Harda
 Ajay Khare - Rewa

Maharashtra - 2004

Sayeed Kasam Sayeed Jamruddin	 192-Gangapur

Position in state and national politics

References

External links
 The Socialist
 समाजवादी जन परिषद
 
 Anti MNC Forum 
Indian Socialist leader Jugal Kishore Raibir passes away
  

Socialist parties in India
Democratic socialist parties in Asia
Political parties established in 1995